Strickland's Frozen Custard is an American ice cream chain, based in Akron, Ohio with 5 locations in Ohio.  The chain was founded in 1936 by Bill and Florence Strickland of Akron.  Strickland's makes its ice cream fresh on-site daily, and generally serves only three or four flavors a day.  Despite the chain's name, Strickland's product does not contain egg yolks, and so is legally not frozen custard.  Rather, it is similar to soft-serve ice cream, but contains less air than typical soft-serve.

The original Strickland's is still operating, and is located at 1809 Triplett Boulevard in Akron, in the same location as when it opened in 1936.

References

External links

Companies based in Akron, Ohio
Restaurants in Ohio
Restaurants established in 1936
Ice cream parlors in the United States
1936 establishments in Ohio